The Woman Patriot Corporation (WPC) was an American Progressive Era organization formed by women who had been previously active in the National Association Opposed to Women's Suffrage. The group identified as anticommunist, anti-pacifist, and anti-feminist. The WPC was formed in response to the then recent enfranchisement of women via the Nineteenth Amendment on August 26, 1920.

Founding 
The fear of conservative women at the time was the burgeoning feminist movement taking root in women's colleges which would allegedly plant the idea in men's minds that because women were now seen as independent, they could shirk their economic duties as providers.

Leadership 
By 1932, Mrs. Randolph Frothingham (who was from Brookline, Massachusetts) was president of the WPC. Mrs. John Fremont Hill from Boston was the vice president of the organization, and Mrs. Lewis C. Lucas from Washington, D.C. was the secretary-treasurer. As of 1932, the board of directors included Mrs. Frederic Jay Cotton of Boston, Mrs. Rufus M. Gibs of Baltimore, Mrs. James Cunningham Gray of Boston, Mrs. Paul Killiam of Cambridge, Mrs. Frederic W. Longfellow of New York, Mrs. Francis E. Slattery of Brighton, and Miss Mary G. Kilbreth. Kilbreth previously worked as the acting president of the New York State Association Opposed to Woman Suffrage.

Activity 
The WPC, having formed after World War I and during the First Red Scare, was allied against communism, anarchy, and pacifism (especially internationally).

In the 1920s, Mrs. Randolph Frothingham, who was then on the board of directors for the WPC, filed alongside the group with regards to a Supreme Court case called Massachusetts v. Mellon, consolidated with Frothingham v. Mellon.

The WPC had been compiling a list of individuals which they wanted barred from entering the United States, including George Bernard Shaw and the grandson of Karl Marx. Infamously, this also included filing a memorandum complaining of Albert Einstein's return to the United States. Einstein, a Jewish German-born American citizen and socialist pacifist, was targeted for his preaching against the use of nuclear weaponry. The Woman Patriot Corporation attempted to bar his entry into the United States and stated:

Einstein was not merely a pernicious influence; he was the ringleader of an anarcho-communist program whose aim was to shatter the military machinery of national governments as a preliminary for world revolution.Frothingham claimed that Einstein was "affiliated with more anarchist and Communist groups than Josef Stalin himself." She said that letting Einstein into the US would "allow anarchy to stalk in unmolested". Copies of Frothingham's letter urging the US State Department to bar Einstein's entry to the United States were distributed to US consuls. In response to these efforts, Einstein threatened to cancel his engagement with Princeton University if his visa were not issued within 24 hours. The visa was granted.

In 1932, the WPC had Mary G. Kilbreth of its board of directors testify for the 72nd US Congress, against federal legislation concerning birth control which it considered to be immoral, a measure which would lead to population control, and a tyrannical imposition of federal power over the states.

References

Sources 

20th-century establishments in the United States
Women's organizations based in the United States
Anti-suffragist organizations
Anti-communist organizations in the United States